This is a list of all the bridges and viaducts in the ceremonial county of Lincolnshire, England.

Bridges are listed under their current use or traffic. For example, Torksey Viaduct is listed under 'Highway' as it is now used by foot and cycle traffic, and not under 'Railway' as it used to be. However, if the bridge or viaduct has not been re-purposed yet it listed in the section of its original use.

Railway bridges

Highway bridges

A

B

C

D

E

F

G

H

I

K

L

M

N

O

P

R

S

T

W

Other bridges

See also 

List of railway bridges and viaducts in the United Kingdom
List of canal aqueducts in the United Kingdom
List of tunnels in the United Kingdom
List of bridges

England transport-related lists
Bridges and viaducts
Lincolnshire